George W. Thompkins (April 9, 1841 - February 22, 1934) was an American Corporal in the American Civil War. He was awarded the Medal of Honor for his actions with the 124th New York Infantry at the Battle of Fort Stedman. He was born in Orange County, New York and is buried in Vale Cemetery, Schenectady after his death on 22 February, 1934 in Schenectady, New York.

Medal of Honor Citation 
For extraordinary heroism on 25 March 1865, while serving with Company F, 124th New York Infantry, in action at Petersburg, Virginia, for capture of flag of 49th Alabama Infantry (Confederate States of America) from an officer who, with colors in hand, was rallying his men.

Date Issued: 6 April, 1865

References 

1841 births
1934 deaths